Pathway Commons is a database of biological pathways and interactions.

See also
 Biological pathway
 Reactome

References

External links
 pathwaycommons

Biological databases
Metabolism
Systems biology